Obaid Khalifa Mubarak Mesari (born April 13, 1985) is an Emirati  football player who plays for Al Sharjah SC.

References

External links
 

1985 births
Living people
Emirati footballers
Association football defenders
United Arab Emirates international footballers
Al Ahli Club (Dubai) players
Ajman Club players
Sharjah FC players
Footballers at the 2006 Asian Games
UAE Pro League players
Asian Games competitors for the United Arab Emirates